Carley Uddenberg(born 6 July 2000) is a footballer who plays as a defender for the Seneca Sting. Born in Canada, she represents the Saint Kitts and Nevis women's national team.

Early life
Uddenberg is a native of Richmond Hill, Ontario in Canada. She played youth soccer with Richmond Hill SC, and for the Jean Vanier CSS high school soccer team.

College career
For college, she began attending Seneca College, playing for the women's soccer team in 2018. She serves as co-captain for the team. She scored her first goals on September 16, 2018, scoring twice in a 9-0 victory over Fleming College.

International career
Uddenberg was a member of the Saint Kitts and Nevis under-20 national team in 2018. She has also appeared for the Saint Kitts and Nevis senior national team, including in the 2020 CONCACAF Women's Olympic Qualifying Championship on 1 February 2020 against Mexico. She came on as a substitute in the 82nd minute for Brittney Lawrence, with the match finishing as a 0–6 loss.

Personal life
Uddenberg is a native of Richmond Hill, Ontario, with her paternal grandparents hailing from Saint Kitts and Nevis. She is the older sister of Cloey Uddenberg and Kayla Uddenberg, who are also members of the Saint Kitts and Nevis women's national football team. She is majoring in early childhood education at Seneca College.

She is also a youth soccer coach with Aurora FC.

References

External links
 

2000 births
Living people
Citizens of Saint Kitts and Nevis through descent
Saint Kitts and Nevis women's footballers
Women's association football defenders
Saint Kitts and Nevis women's international footballers
Sportspeople from Richmond Hill, Ontario
Soccer people from Ontario
University and college soccer players in Canada
Canadian people of Saint Kitts and Nevis descent
Sportspeople of Saint Kitts and Nevis descent
Seneca College alumni